Benjamin Thackrah (August 13, 1845 - May 20, 1912) was a Scottish soldier who fought for the Union Army during the American Civil War. He received the Medal of Honor for valor.

Biography
Thackrah served in the American Civil War in the 115th New York Infantry. He received the Medal of Honor on May 2, 1890 for his actions near Fort Gates, Florida on April 1, 1864.

Medal of Honor citation

Citation:

Was a volunteer in the surprise and capture of the enemy's picket.

See also

List of American Civil War Medal of Honor recipients: T-Z

References

External links
 Military Times
 

1845 births
1912 deaths
Union Army soldiers
United States Army Medal of Honor recipients
American Civil War recipients of the Medal of Honor